The 2019 Asian Women's Youth Handball Championship was the 8th edition of the championship held from 21 to 30 August 2019 at Jaipur, India under the aegis of Asian Handball Federation. It was the second time in history that championship was organised in India by the Handball Federation of India. It also acted as the qualification tournament for the 2020 Women's Youth World Handball Championship.

Draw
The draw was held on 20 April 2019 in Jaipur, India.

Iran withdrew from the tournament before the draw and was substituted by Bhutan. Bhutan withdrew from the tournament after the draw, therefore AHF Executive Committee has decided to substitute Mongolia in Group B in place of Bhutan to balance the number of teams in each group.

Preliminary round
All times are local (UTC+05:30).

Group A

Group B

Knockout stage

Bracket

5–8th place bracket

5–8th place semifinals

Semifinals

Ninth place game

Seventh place game

Fifth place game

Third place game

Final

Final standings

References

External links
Results
https://asianhandball.org/8awyhc/

Asian Handball Championships
International handball competitions hosted by India
Asian Women's Youth Handball Championship
Asian Youth
Sport in Jaipur
Asian Women's Youth Handball Championship